Prags (Ladin: Braies) is a comune (municipality) in South Tyrol in northern Italy, located about  northeast of Bolzano.

Geography

Prags is located in the Prags valley in the northern Dolomites. The valley is split into two branches, the western one ending at the Pragser Wildsee, a mountain lake, the eastern one at the Plätzwiese, an extended alpine pasture.

Prags borders the following municipalities: Cortina d'Ampezzo, Toblach, Mareo, Welsberg-Taisten, Olang, and Niederdorf.

Frazioni
The municipality of Prags contains the frazioni (subdivisions, mainly villages and hamlets) Außerprags (Braies di Fuori), Innerprags (Braies di Dentro), Schmieden (Ferrara) and St. Veit (San Vito).

History

Coat-of-arms
The emblem represents a stag on a mountain with three vert peaks, crossed by a wavy stream of argent. The emblem was granted in 1968.

Society

Linguistic distribution
According to the 2011 census, 99.23% of the population speak German, 0.61% Italian and 0.15% Ladin as first language.

Demographic evolution

References

External links

 Homepage of the municipality

Municipalities of South Tyrol